The 2018 National Women's League was the sixteenth season of the NWL, New Zealand's top level women's football league since its establishment in 2002. Seven teams were again involved in this season representing the different regions in New Zealand. This was the first year that the league had two rounds with the two highest-placed sides progressing to a one-off grand final. The season also featured a double header round over Labour weekend, in which all sides except Capital played two matches over the weekend.

Teams

Regular season

League table

Positions by round

Fixtures and results
New Zealand women's football league matches took place from September to December 2018 and also for the first time include a double header round over Labour weekend.

Round 1

Bye: Northern Lights

Round 2

Bye: Auckland

Round 3

Bye: WaiBOP

Round 4

Bye: Canterbury United Pride

Round 5

Bye: Southern United

Round 6 (Double Header Week)

Bye: Capital

Round 7

Bye: Central

Round 8

Bye: Auckland

Round 9

Bye: WaiBOP

Round 10

Bye: Southern United

Round 11

Bye: Canterbury United Pride

Round 12

Bye: Northern Lights

Round 13

Bye: Central

Final

Statistics

Top scorers

Hat-tricks

Own goals

References

External links
Official website

2018
football
Women
Women